Hotchkis is a surname. Notable people with the surname include:

Anna Hotchkis (1885–1984), Scottish artist and writer
Daniel Hotchkis, Australian field hockey player
Mark Hotchkis (born 1969), American racing driver
Joan Hotchkis (1927–2022), American actress

See also
Hotchkiss (disambiguation)